Kevin Alexander McKenzie (born 16 July 1948) is a South African first-class cricketer whose career with Transvaal lasted from his first season in 1966/67 to the final one in 1986/87.

Biography 
A native of Pretoria, Kevin McKenzie was educated at Johannesburg's King Edward VII School and played for Transvaal in the Nuffield week, 1966 and 1967, also playing, in 1967, for the South African schools team.  He played in 133 first-class matches, scoring 6756 runs at an average of 36.51. Batting right-handed in the lower middle order, he scored 13 centuries and 34 half centuries.

In Currie Cup cricket he played in 122 matches, scoring 6076 runs at an average of 36.38. He has been described by player and commentator Robin Jackman as "one of the best hookers of the ball I've ever seen". He played for South Africa in 7 unofficial "Tests". McKenzie is the father of Neil McKenzie, South African international cricket player whose career extended from 1999 to 2009.

References

Footnotes

Gauteng cricketers
South African cricketers
Alumni of King Edward VII School (Johannesburg)
Cricketers from Pretoria
White South African people
South African people of Scottish descent
1948 births
Living people